Laurel Creek is a tributary of Goose Creek river in Clay County in the U.S. state of Kentucky.
The name comes from the proliferation of mountain laurel on its riverbanks.

Tributaries and post offices 
Its eponymous post office was established by Joseph Hubbard on 1865-04-21, lasting until 1968.
It was originally located at the mouth of what is now named Morgan Branch, a tributary of Laurel Creek that used to be named Falls Branch, and primarily served the area of Hubbardsville.
It moved 3 miles downstream to the mouth of Collins Fork, another Laurel tributary, some time before 1902.
It was a rural branch of Manchester post office from 1966 until its closure.

Morgan Branch is also the location of the village, school, and postoffice of Fall Rock.

Hubbardsville's second post office was named Caution, from 1902 to 1918, although postmaster George Hall wanted to call it Clio after his 5-year-old daughter.
That clashed with an existing post office of the same name in Whitley County, however.

The Millpond post office was originally named Bessie by postmaster John L. Campbell, who operated it between 1907-11-15 and 1909-06-15, possibly after his wife Elizabeth.
Its second postmaster Oscar Hornsby, who reëstablished it on 1921-05-14 in his own general store near to Lower Laurel School, wanted to retain the name; but the name Millpond was assigned instead.
Local oral histories disagree as to the origin of this name.
It was either named after the pond of Joe Hornsby's flour mill that was built in the 1880s, or it was named after the pond of an old sawmill.
Either way, the mill has long since vanished; and at the time of closure in August 1963 the postoffice was located just downstream of Mill Pond Hollow,  up Laurel Creek.

See also
List of rivers of Kentucky

References

Sources

Further reading 

 

Rivers of Kentucky
Rivers of Clay County, Kentucky